Poabromylus is an extinct genus of small artiodactyl, of the family Protoceratidae, endemic to North America. They resembled deer but were more closely related to camelids.

Fossil distribution
Fossils have been recovered from: 
Big Red Horizon, Chambers Tuff Formation, Presidio County, Texas 
Titus Canyon, Titus Canyon Formation, Inyo County, California
Titanothere Quarry, Duchesne River Formation, Uintah County, Utah
Badwater Locality, Wagon Bed Formation, Natrona County, Wyoming

References 

Eocene even-toed ungulates
 
Priabonian genus extinctions
Eocene mammals of North America
Fossil taxa described in 1931
Prehistoric even-toed ungulate genera